Pleumeur-Bodou is a commune in the Côtes-d'Armor department of Brittany in northwestern France.

Population

Inhabitants of Pleumeur-Bodou are called pleumeurois in French.

Sister town
Pleuveur-Bodoù is twinned with Crosshaven, a village in Cork Harbour, Ireland.

See also
Communes of the Côtes-d'Armor department
Telstar

References

External links

Communes of Côtes-d'Armor